Massachusetts House of Representatives' 2nd Plymouth district in the United States is one of 160 legislative districts included in the lower house of the Massachusetts General Court. It covers part of Plymouth County. Republican Susan Williams Gifford of Wareham has represented the district since 2003.

Towns represented
The district includes the following localities:
 Carver
 part of Middleborough
 Wareham

The current district geographic boundary overlaps with that of the Massachusetts Senate's 1st Plymouth and Bristol district.

Former locales
The district previously covered:
 Hingham, circa 1872 
 Hull, circa 1872

Representatives
 Eliphalet L. Cushing, circa 1858 
 Demerick Marble, circa 1859 
 Franklin W. Hatch, circa 1888 
 Walter Haynes, circa 1920 
 Nathaniel Tilden, circa 1951 
 William J. Flynn, Jr., circa 1975 
 Charles Decas
 Ruth Provost
 Susan Williams Gifford, 2003-current

See also
 List of Massachusetts House of Representatives elections
 Other Plymouth County districts of the Massachusetts House of Representatives: 1st, 3rd, 4th, 5th, 6th, 7th, 8th, 9th, 10th, 11th, 12th
 List of Massachusetts General Courts
 List of former districts of the Massachusetts House of Representatives

Images
Portraits of legislators

References

External links
 Ballotpedia
  (State House district information based on U.S. Census Bureau's American Community Survey).
 League of Women Voters Plymouth Area

House
Government of Plymouth County, Massachusetts